Statisticians in the Pharmaceutical Industry, abbreviated to  PSI, is an organisation for the promotion of statistical thinking in order to improve the quality of research and development in the pharmaceutical industry.

PSI is a non-profit organisation formed in 1977 which was later converted to a company limited by guarantee, a process which was completed in January 2003. PSI achieves its vision by providing a forum for regular discussion of statistics and matters relating to the practice of statistics in the pharmaceutical industry, as well as promoting good statistical practice within the industry.

PSI's membership is around 1000 statisticians from across the Pharmaceutical Industry and academia. About 80% of these are UK based. PSI hosts an annual three day conference for its members, as well as several one-day meetings and training courses. It publishes a quarterly newsletter "SPIN" and sponsors the international journal "Pharmaceutical Statistics", published by John Wiley & Sons.

PSI is a member of the European Federation of Statisticians in the Pharmaceutical Industry (EFSPI).

PSI Conference
Since 1978 PSI has held a conference annually, usually in England. On five occasions the conference has been held outside England (in Cardiff, Brussels, Glasgow, Berlin and Amsterdam). The full list of conference locations is listed below:

Footnotes
  The abbreviation PSI is chosen in preference to the more literal SPI to avoid connotations with the word "spy", and to tie in with the Greek letter Ψ - Greek letters playing a substantial part in statistics. Ψ was the original logo of PSI.
  The 2020 conference had been scheduled to take place in Barcelona but was changed to a Webinar series because of the Covid-19 pandemic.

External links
 PSI website
 Pharmaceutical Statistics (PSI Journal)

Pharmaceutical statistics
Pharmacy-related professional associations
Statistical societies